The 2nd congressional district of South Carolina is in central and southwestern South Carolina. The district spans from Columbia to the South Carolina side of the Augusta, Georgia metropolitan area.

From 1993 through 2012, it included all of Lexington, Jasper, Hampton, Allendale and Barnwell counties; most of Richland and Beaufort counties and parts of Aiken, Calhoun and Orangeburg counties.

It was made more compact in the 2010 round of redistricting, and now comprises all of Lexington, Aiken and Barnwell counties, most of Richland County, and part of Orangeburg County. Besides Columbia (60 percent of which is in the district), other major cities in the district include Aiken and North Augusta.

The district's current configuration dates from 1933, following South Carolina losing a seat in apportionment as a result of the 1930 Census showing that the state's population had declined. Before that time, much of its territory had been within the 6th district.

As a Columbia-based district from 1933 to the early 1990s, it was a fairly compact district in the central part of the state, which was largely coextensive with the Columbia metropolitan area. As a result of the 1990 census, the state legislature was required to draw a black-majority district. In a deal between Republicans and Democrats, the 6th district, previously located in the northeastern portion of the state, was reconfigured to incorporate most of the old 2nd's black residents. To make up for the loss in population, the 2nd was pushed as far west as the fringes of the Augusta suburbs and as far south as Beaufort/Hilton Head. As of 2019, the district was more than 69% white.

Since 1965 the 2nd district has been held by the Republican Party, coinciding with the late 20th-century realignment of political parties in the South. In the decades after the Civil War and before disenfranchisement in 1895 under the new state constitution, members of the Republican Party in South Carolina and the South were mostly African Americans, including many freedmen enfranchised due to Republican support for amendments for emancipation, citizenship and the franchise. After white Democrats regained control of state governments across the South, in the late 19th century, they passed new constitutions from 1890 to 1908 to disenfranchise blacks, excluding them totally from the political process. The Republican Party was crippled in the region and nearly comatose.

As a result of the Civil Rights Movement, Congress passed the Voting Rights Act of 1965, which provided for federal enforcement of blacks' constitutional rights. That year, the 2nd district's second-term Democratic congressman, Albert Watson, resigned, then ran as a Republican in the ensuing special election and won, becoming the first Republican to represent South Carolina in the House since Reconstruction. 

However, the district had begun shedding its Yellow Dog Democrat roots before then. Some of the old-line Democrats began splitting their tickets as early as the 1940s, and some counties in the district haven't supported the official Democratic candidate for president since the 1950s. The district swung hard to Strom Thurmond during his third-party bid for president in 1948, and gave an equally massive margin to Barry Goldwater in 1964. Since 1964, Jimmy Carter has been the only Democrat to come close to carrying it. However, conservative Democrats held most local offices well into the 1980s.

Watson gave up the seat to run for governor in 1970. His successor, state senator Floyd Spence, held the seat for more than 30 years. He was chairman of the House Armed Services Committee from 1995 to 2001, and died a few months after being elected to a 16th term.  He was succeeded in a special election by one of his former aides, state senator Joe Wilson.

Wilson has since been reelected eleven times. In the most recent election, held on November 11, 2022, Wilson earned 60% of the vote against Democrat Judd Larkins.

Counties 
Counties in the 2023-2033 district map.
 Aiken County
 Barnwell County
 Lexington County
 Orangeburg County (part)
 Richland County (part)

Election results from presidential races

List of members representing the district

Recent election results

2012

2014

2016

2018

2020

2022

See also

South Carolina's congressional districts
List of United States congressional districts

Notes

References

 Congressional Biographical Directory of the United States 1774–present
 Political Graveyard database of South Carolina congressmen

02
Aiken County
Allendale County
Barnwell County
Beaufort County
Calhoun County
Hampton County
Jasper County
Lexington County
Orangeburg County
Richland County
1933 establishments in South Carolina